Pravara is the smallest of the major tributaries of Godavari river located in Maharashtra, India. Among the 7 major tributaries, it is the only tributary which originates in the Western Ghats akin to Godavari. Also, it is the only major tributary of Godavari to have both its source and confluence located within the same district - Ahmednagar.

Etymology 
As per Indian Vedas, Sage Agastya meditated by consuming only water and air for a long tenure. Due to his incredible devotion, Lord Shiva appeared, blessed him, and left a stream of Ganga that came to be known as the Pravara River.

Origin 
The Pravara rises on the eastern slopes of the Sahayadris between Kulang and Ratangad mountains in the Ahmednagar District of Maharashtra.

Course 
Close to its origin the river flows into the town of Bhandardara. Here, the Bhandardara Dam is constructed across the river forming the Arthur Lake. The gates of the dam are periodically opened, to allow drownstream flow of the Pravara, giving rise to the Umbrella Falls. From hereon the river takes an east ward course and 58 km downstream, reaches another city- Sangamner, where the river Mahalungi converges with it. This is the second largest city within the Ahmednagar District. Continuing eastwards, the river is joined by another tributary, this time on its right bank: River Mula.

Tributaries 
In its short run, the river acquires water from two main tributaries : Mahalungi and Mula.
Mahalungi : It rises on the southern and eastern slopes of Patta and Aundha. After the course of three miles, it passes east into the Sinnar taluka of Nashik. It reenters Ahmednagar, after taking a bend towards south, it ends at Sangamner, where it converges with Pravara at its left-bank.
Mula : This river rises on the eastern slopes of the Sahayadris between Ratangad and Harichandragad. For the first twenty miles, it flows parallel to Pravara, draining the southernmost or Kotul valley of Akole taluka. Passing the town of Kotul it takes a bend to Baleshvar. It then crosses through Sangamner, Parner. The Dam Mula is constructed across the river at Baragaon Nandur. The river drains into Pravara just before the town Nevasa.
Adhala : It originates in north of Akole on the Slopes of Patta and Mahakali. Merges with the Pravara 3 km (2 miles) west of Sangamner.

Dams 
 Bhandardara Dam
 Nilwande Dam

References 

Rivers of Maharashtra
Tributaries of the Godavari River
Rivers of India